Chapel Hill is an unincorporated community in Perry County, Ohio.

History
Chapel Hill was laid out in 1849. A post office called Chapel Hill was established in 1848 and remained in operation until 1894.

References

Unincorporated communities in Perry County, Ohio
Unincorporated communities in Ohio
1849 establishments in Ohio